Jacob S. Sinclair (born March 7, 1985) is an American record producer, musician, singer, and songwriter. His production and songwriting credits include Weezer, Fall Out Boy, Panic! at the Disco, 5 Seconds of Summer, Pink, New Politics, Andrew McMahon in the Wilderness, Gin Wigmore, and Train.

Early life

Born in Idaho, Sinclair started playing music at age 7, where he discovered a love for learning and playing songs by The Beatles. He started his first band at age 11 by convincing his friends to buy instruments, and furthered his skills playing with his father in their local church band. During Sinclair's time as a member of the band The Films, Sinclair met Butch Walker who became a mentor for him, leading Sinclair to move from New York to Los Angeles where he began engineering for Walker, working with artists such as Taylor Swift, Pink, Avril Lavigne, Keith Urban, Panic! at the Disco, Fall Out Boy, Weezer and Train.

Career
After writing and producing his first RIAA Gold single with New Politics ("Harlem"), followed by his first RIAA Platinum single with 5 Seconds of Summer ("She Looks So Perfect"), Sinclair moved into his own studio in Echo Park. There he produced Panic! At the Disco's #1 album Death of a Bachelor and Weezer's White Album. He is performing on tour with Beck.

Sinclair co-wrote and produced Panic! at the Disco's Pray for the Wicked and Death of a Bachelor albums (which debuted at number one on the US Billboard 200) and produced Weezer's 2016 Weezer (White Album). Both were nominated for Best Rock Album at the 59th Annual Grammy Awards. He co-wrote and produced "Uma Thurman" by Fall Out Boy, which debuted at number one on the U.S. iTunes Chart, reached number 22 on the Billboard Hot 100, and was certified 2× Platinum by the RIAA in December 2015. Sinclair received a Grammy nomination for Album of the Year for his work as engineer and bassist on Taylor Swift's "Everything Has Changed" alongside producer Butch Walker. He co-wrote and produced the debut single, "She Looks So Perfect" by 5 Seconds of Summer that peaked at number one in over five countries and won Song of the Year at the 2014 ARIA Awards. Sinclair is the former bassist of the indie/pop rock band The Films and the lead singer and producer of the indie pop duo Alohaha. In November 2018 Sinclair won the Spotify Secret Genius Award for best rock producer.

Personal life
Sinclair is married to actress Kate Micucci. They had a baby in January 2020. They live in Los Angeles and New York with their dog Claire.

Discography

References

Record producers from Idaho
American male songwriters
Musicians from Boise, Idaho
21st-century American musicians
Living people
Songwriters from Idaho
1985 births
Record producers from California
Musicians from Los Angeles
21st-century American male musicians